Sealdah - Rampurhat Intercity Express is a Express train of the Indian Railways connecting Sealdah in West Bengal and Rampurhat Junction of West Bengal. It is currently being operated with 12373/12374 train numbers on three days a week basis.

Service

The 12373/Sealdah - Rampurhat Intercity Express has an average speed of 58 km/hr and covers 214.8 km in 3 hrs 40 mins. 12374/Rampurhat - Sealdah Intercity Express has an average speed of 58 km/hr and covers 214.8 km in 3 hrs 40 mins.

Route and halts 

The important halts of the train are:

Coach composite

The train has standard ICF rakes with max speed of 110 kmph. The train consists of 10 coaches :

 1 Chair Car
 6 General
 2 Second-class Luggage/parcel van

Traction

Both trains are hauled by an Asansol Loco Shed based WAG-5 or WAG-5P or WAM-4 electric locomotive from Sealdah to Rampurhat and vice versa.

Rake Sharing 

The train shares its rake with 13013/13014 Barddhaman - Rampurhat Express

See also 

 Sealdah railway station
 Rampurhat railway station
 Barddhaman - Rampurhat Express
 Maa Tara Express

Notes

External links 

 12373/Sealdah - Rampurhat Intercity Express
 12374/Rampurhat - Sealdah Intercity Express

References 

Transport in Kolkata
Transport in Rampurhat
Intercity Express (Indian Railways) trains
Rail transport in West Bengal
Railway services introduced in 2011